The Kaduna State College of Education is a state government higher education institution located in Gidan Waya, Kafanchan, Kaduna State, Nigeria. It is affiliated to Ahmadu Bello University for its degree programmes. The current Provost is Alexander Kure.

History 
The Kaduna State College of Education was established in 1977.

Library 
The college Library was established in 1977 to meet the information needs of both staff and students of the college with over 1000 seating capacity at a time. the college library has total collection of 23000 volumes of books and e-library section with over 60 computers with internet connectivity.

Courses 
The institution offers the following courses;

 Christian Religious Studies
 English
 Economics
 Agricultural Science and Education
 Computer Education
 Education and Islamic Studies
 Biology
 Arabic
 Chemistry Education
 French
 Adult and Non-Formal Education
 Hausa
 History
 Early Childhood Care Education
 Physical And Health Education
 Integrated Science
 Geography
 Home Economics and Education
 Business Education
 Theatre Arts and Education
 Fine And Applied Arts
 Special Needs Education
 Primary Education Studies
 Islamic Studies
 Education and Social Studies
 Mathematics Education
 Educational Administration and Planning
 Special Education
 Technical Education
 Guidance and Counseling
 Physical and Health Education

Alumni
 Joe El, Nigerian hip-hop singer

References

External links

Universities and colleges in Nigeria
1977 establishments in Nigeria